E. M. "Buddy" Childers (born October 17, 1938) is a retired American politician in the state of Georgia.

Childers served in the United States Marine Corps Reserve and graduated from Model high school in Rome, Georgia. He later owned a telecommunications company. Childers served in the Georgia House of Representatives from district 15 as a Democrat from 1974 to 2004.

References

1938 births
Living people
Democratic Party members of the Georgia House of Representatives